The Nišava District is one of nine administrative districts of Southern and Eastern Serbia. It expands to the south-eastern parts of Serbia. According to the 2011 census results, it has a population of 372,404 inhabitants. The administrative center of the district is the city of Niš. After South Bačka, it is second largest District in Serbia.

Municipalities
The district is divided into 6 municipalities and the city of Niš, which is divided into 5 municipalities.

The municipalities of the district are:
 Aleksinac
 Svrljig
 Merošina
 Ražanj
 Doljevac
 Gadžin Han

City of Niš is divided into municipalities of:
 Medijana
 Niška Banja
 Palilula
 Pantelej
 Crveni Krst

Demographics

According to the last official census done in 2011, the Nišava District has 376,319 inhabitants. Census doesn’t include refugees. It’s estimated that there are up to 524,500 people living in Nišava District.

Ethnic groups
 Serbs = 351,676
 Romani = 11,499
 others 13,144

Tourism
Within the city boundaries itself stands the Niš Fortress, which ranks among the most beautiful and best preserved fortresses in the Balkans, built in the late seventeenth century. On the outskirts of Niš is a unique monument - the Skull Tower (Ćele kula) built by the Turks from the skulls and heads of the Serbian warriors who died in the Battle of Čegar in 1809, led by Stevan Sinđelić, against the Turks. After the Turkish victory, this battle was decisive for the failure of the First Serb Uprising.

The Nišava District also features Niška Banja, it is one of the best known spa tourism centers in Serbia. It is located on the bottom of Suva Planina and a few kilometers away from Niš.

See also
 Administrative divisions of Serbia
 Districts of Serbia

References

Note: All official material made by the Government of Serbia is public by law.

External links

 

 
Districts of Southern and Eastern Serbia